Amy Myers (born 1965, Austin, TX) is an American artist. She is best known for her large-scale charcoal and pastel drawings, which depict complicated worlds reminiscent of scientific patterns. Her father was a physicist, a fact often noted as an influence on the aesthetics and structure of her work.

Education 
Myers received a BFA from the Kansas City Art Institute in 1995, and an MFA from the School of the Art Institute of Chicago in 1999.

Career 
Myers has had solo exhibitions at Valerie McKenzie Fine Art in New York, Taley Dunn Gallery in Texas, Sweeney Art Gallery in Riverside, California, Atlanta Contemporary Arts Center in Georgia, Mike Weiss Gallery in New York, Mary Boone Gallery in New York, Danese Gallery in New York, Rhona Hoffman Gallery in Chicago, and Suzanne Vielmetter Projects in Los Angeles, among other venues. Myers has received awards from the Pollock-Krasner Foundation, the American Academy in Rome, Mana Contemporary, and the Marie Walsh Sharpe Foundation. Myers' work has been discussed in numerous publications including Hyperallergic, the New York Times, BOMB Magazine, Art in America, ArtCritical, and Artnews.

Collections 
Myers' work is in the collections of the Guggenheim Museum in New York, the Museum of Fine Arts in Houston, the Fort Wayne Museum of Art in Fort Wayne, Indiana, the Greenville County Museum of Art in Greenville, South Carolina, and the Laguna Art Museum in Laguna Beach, California, among others.

References

External links 
 Official website
 Talk at Taley Dunn Gallery
 Video by Elizabeth Foundation for the Arts

1965 births
Living people
Amy Myers
Amy Myers
Artists from Austin, Texas
School of the Art Institute of Chicago alumni
20th-century American painters
21st-century American painters
20th-century American women artists
21st-century American women artists